The Stars Are So Big, The Earth Is So Small... Stay as You Are is the debut album of Pram, released in September 1993 through Too Pure. The album takes its name from a caption of an image in Marshall McLuhan’s work The Medium is the Massage.

Reception
AllMusic described the group's post-rock sound as drawing on various possible influences, including the Velvet Underground, Nico, Yoko Ono, "Miles Davis' minimalist material from the late '60s," as well as "German futurists Can and Faust," and composer Angelo Badalamenti. The site concluded that "the results on this eight-song release are both original and enchanting. The surrealistic lyrics are disturbing and dreamlike, with references to insects and outer space, and the haunting music draws on a wealth of unexpected instrumentation (trumpet, toy piano, etc.) combined with Rosie Cuckston's wispy, off-key vocals." The Vinyl District called the album that "a solid full-length, but it captures Pram partway to full flower."

Track listing

Personnel 
Rosie Cuckston – vocals, keyboards
Matt Eaton - guitar, bass guitar, keyboards, sampler
Sam Owen – bass guitar, guitar, keyboards, backing vocals
Pram – recording
Max Simpson – keyboards, sampler
Daren Garratt – drums

References

External links 
 

1993 albums
Pram (band) albums
Too Pure albums